Midday Adventures: Trace of Blood (Persian: ماجرای نیمروز: رد خون, romanized: majaraye nimroz: rad khoon) is a 2019 Iranian war drama film directed by Mohammad Hossein Mahdavian and written by Ebrahim Amini and Hoseein Torab Nejad. The film is a direct sequel to the 2017 film Midday Adventures.

The film screened for the first time at the 37th Fajr Film Festival and was released on September 25, 2019 in Iran theatrically.

Cast 
 Behnoosh Tabatabei as Sima
 Javad Ezzati as Sadegh
 Hadi Hejazifar as Kamal
 Mosen Kiaee as Afshin Gohari
 Hasti Mahdavi as Zohre
 Hossein Mehri as Abbas
 Mahdi Zaminpardaz as Masoud
 Mohammad Asgari as Ebrahim

Reception

Awards and nominations

Home media 
The film was released on April 16, 2020 on home video. It became the most-watched iranian political movie on home video in Iran.

References

External links 

2010s Persian-language films
Iranian war drama films
Iran–Iraq War films
2010s war drama films